David Kennedy (born 1964) is a British actor, known for his role as Dirk Savage in the Channel 4 soap opera Hollyoaks.

Career
Since graduating from Webber Douglas Academy of Dramatic Art in 1992, Kennedy has appeared in over 50 television dramas including Ashes to Ashes, Trial & Retribution, Ultimate Force, The Bill, London's Burning, Rose and Maloney, Waking the Dead, and Holby City. He also played the role of Billy 'Two Hats' in William and Mary for three series. He has also played two roles in EastEnders; Dave Roberts in 2002, and Ray in 2006.

Kennedy has also appeared in several films including Reign of Fire in 2002 and in the 2010 remake of Clash of the Titans. Kennedy appeared in season 1 of Marcella.

From 2011 to 2018, he portrayed the role of Dirk Savage in Hollyoaks.

In 2020, he appeared in an episode of the BBC drama series Moving On, the ITV  drama series Liar and he played the role of DCS Phil Adams in the ITV drama, Honour.

References

External links

https://www.spotlight.com/2213-0165-8339

English male soap opera actors
Living people
1964 births